Bruce C. Bronzan (September 28, 1947 – September 28, 2020) was an American politician who served as a member of the California State Assembly from 1982 until his resignation in 1993.

Bronzan was born in Fresno, California. He received his undergraduate degree from California State University, Fresno, was a fellow with the Coro Foundation in San Francisco, and received a master's degree in Urban Studies from Occidental College in Los Angeles. Prior to serving in the Assembly, Bronzan was a high school teacher, then became a program director in mental health in Fresno County before successfully running for the County Board of Supervisors. He served on the Fresno County Board of Supervisors from 1975 until his election to the Assembly in 1982. In the Assembly, he was Chairman of the Health Committee, the Select Committee on Mental Health, and the Appropriations Sub-Committee on Health. He became a nationally recognized leader in mental health, successfully carrying the Mental Health Reform Act, Re-Alignment, and the first mental health parity bill in the nation. He was also extensively involved in policy work for kids-at-risk, aging and long-term-care, and public health with more than a hundred pieces of major legislation passed under his name.

After resigning from the Assembly early in 1993, he became the Associate Dean for Administration and Development, with the Medical School at the University of California, San Francisco. He was also a Senior Scholar with the UCSF Phil Lee Institute of Health Policy Studies. He was also the President of Trilogy, a healthcare internet company that specializes in developing community based web portals in health and human service for counties and states.

He was married to Jeri Brittell Bronzan, and resided in Greenbrae, California. Daughter, Chloë Bronzan is a professional actress and director in the San Francisco Bay area. His son, Forest Bronzan, is an investor and entrepreneur and the former CEO of Email Aptitude which was acquired in May 2018. Forest lives in Ross, CA.

He died of lymphoma on September 28, 2020, in Greenbrae, CA at age 73.

References

1947 births
2020 deaths
Democratic Party members of the California State Assembly
People from Fresno, California